Gopi Kishan is 1994 Indian Hindi action comedy movie directed by Mukesh Duggal starring Sunil Shetty in a dual role, supported by Shilpa Shirodkar and Karishma Kapoor. Other cast includes Suresh Oberoi, Aruna Irani, Mohan Joshi, Shammi, Satyendra Kapoor and Mushtaq Khan. 
The film is a remake of K. Bhagyaraj's hit Tamil film Avasara Police 100. This was one of the biggest hit of 1994.

Plot 

Kishan, is a hardened criminal who returns home after completing 14 years imprisonment for murder. Kishan had killed a man in his childhood, when the latter tried to molest his mother. Kishan thinks his father is dead, but he soon learns that his mother has kept the truth under wraps. He learns that his father Suraj Malhotra was a jeweller who killed his partner and ran away with some precious jewels. She tells Kishan that she never saw Suraj after that, and now he is a dreaded gangster in the underworld.

Kishan decides to avenge his father for all his wrongdoings. He singles out Sawant, a powerful man of Suraj and decides to strike on him. Meanwhile, Gopi, a doppelgänger of Kishan, works as a constable in the police force. Gopi has a doting mother, a wife and a kid, but isn't taken seriously as he lacks the guts to become anything worthwhile. Kishan spots Gopi and decides to use him for his purposes. Kishan starts bumping off the goons, while Gopi starts getting the credit.

Soon, Gopi's fortune changes, while Kishan succeeds in furthering his motives. Barkha (Karisma Kapoor), the Commissioner's daughter, falls in love with Kishan. One day, Kishan manages to sneak into Malhotra's lair. He holds Malhotra at gunpoint and shows him the photo of his mother. He learns that Sawant is the kingpin and Suraj the pawn, rather than other way around. Suraj tells Kishan that Sawant's men killed Suraj's partner for the jewels. Suraj somehow scooted off with the money and hid it in the basement of a construction site.

Sawant caught Suraj and told him that the latter has been convicted for the former's crimes. Sawant also tells him that his wife has committed suicide and his son would be killed too, if Suraj does not tell the location of the jewels. Suraj does not tell the location, but to save the infant from death, takes the blame on himself. Upon this, Kishan reveals his true identity. Both realize that Sawant passed some other child as Suraj's child. Kishan learns that the place the money was hidden is the police headquarters.

Kishan decides to retrieve the loot. Now, Gopi starts hunting for Kishan. Meanwhile, Kishan has infuriated Sawant too by killing some of his goons. Kishan's mother, whom Kishan had left to find his father, comes to find him. She runs into Gopi, mistaking him for Kishan. Gopi tricks her and abducts her. But Gopi is in for a surprise when Kishan's mother and Gopi's mother turn out to be acquaintances.

Gopi's mother reveals that when Kishan's mother was in labour, she delivered twins. Gopi's mother was actually childless, so she took one of the kids. Gopi is in a quandary as he cannot arrest his newfound brother, but decides that he has to do this, one way or other. Meanwhile, Kishan has revealed the truth to Seema, who agrees to help him in retrieving the score. Sawant succeeds in nabbing Kishan. Unable to see his son tortured, Suraj spills the beans.

Now, Gopi enters the den and pretends to be Kishan, claiming that Sawant has actually kidnapped the gullible Gopi. One by one, all the villains are unmasked. Suraj is delighted to meet his wife, while both Gopi and Kishan start bringing Sawant's empire to dust. After killing Sawant's son, which provides poetic justice in this case, all the goons are rounded off. Suraj is finally united with his extended family in the end.

Cast
Suniel Shetty as Head Constable Gopinath "Gopi" / Kishan (dual role)
Shilpa Shirodkar as Chanda
Karishma Kapoor as Barkha
Aruna Irani as Geeta Choudhary
Suresh Oberoi as Rajeshwar Choudhary
Mohan Joshi as Sawant
Arun Bakshi as  Corrupt Minister Rautulla Himayati
Shammi as Janki
Satyendra Kapoor as Police Commissioner
Mushtaq Khan as Inspector Mishra
Kishore Bhanushali as Police Constable
Shiva Rindani as Sharad
Vishwajeet Pradhan as Henchmen of Sawant
Guddi Maruti Friend of Barkha
Imtiaz Khan as Retired Police Commissioner

Soundtrack
Anand–Milind and Sameer teamed up after Baaghi and Pehchaan, to deliver another hit musical score. Songs like "Hai Huku", "Yeh Ishq Hai Kya" and "Batti Na Bujha" topped the countdowns and the music topped the charts when released. It was among the best selling albums of 1994.

Notes

References

External links 
 
 twins in Indian films
1994 films
1990s Hindi-language films
Films scored by Anand–Milind
Hindi remakes of Tamil films 
Films about twins